Paradise Lost is an epic Christian poem by John Milton.

Paradise Lost may also refer to:

Music
Paradise Lost (band), a British gothic metal band

Albums
Paradise Lost (Cirith Ungol album)
Paradise Lost (Delta Heavy album)
Paradise Lost, a 2005 album by Hasan Salaam
Paradise Lost (Symphony X album)
Paradise Lost (Paradise Lost album)

Songs
"Paradise Lost (You're the Reason Why)", a song by Half Man Half Biscuit from the 2002 album Cammell Laird Social Club
"Paradise Lost", a song by Kaya from the 2006 album Glitter
Paradise Lost (Herd song), 1967
"Paradise Lost" (Minori Chihara song), 2008
"Paradise Lost", a song by Hollywood Undead from the 2008 album Swan Songs
"Paradise Lost", a song by Gain from the 2015 EP Hawwah
"Paradise Lost", a song by the band Paradise Lost from the 1990 album Lost Paradise
"Paradise Lost, a poem by John Milton", a song by The Used from the 2020 album Heartwork

Film

Paradise Lost (1940 film), a French drama film directed by Abel Gance
Paradise Lost (1971 film), a 1971 tv movie of the play by Clifford Odets (1935)
Paradise Lost: The Child Murders at Robin Hood Hills, a 1996 documentary
Paradise Lost 2: Revelations, a 2000 sequel to Paradise Lost: The Child Murders at Robin Hood Hills
Paradise Lost 3: Purgatory, the 2012, third installment to Paradise Lost: The Child Murders at Robin Hood Hills
Kamen Rider 555: Paradise Lost, a 2003 movie retelling of the tokusatsu TV series Masked Rider 555
Paradise Lost, also known as Turistas, a 2006 vacation horror film
Jonestown: Paradise Lost, 2007 docudrama about the Jonestown tragedy
Eden of the East the Movie II: Paradise Lost, the second theatrical release for the animated series Eden of the East (2010)
Paradise Lost (2011 film), a Chinese teen sex comedy film
Escobar: Paradise Lost, a 2014 romantic thriller film

Theater
Paradise Lost (Penderecki), a 1978 opera by Krzysztof Penderecki
Paradise Lost (play), a 1935 American drama by Clifford Odets
Paradise Lost: Shadows and Wings, a 2007 opera by Eric Whitacre

Television
Paradise Lost (2020 TV series), an American television series debuted in 2020
Paradise Lost (upcoming TV series), an American television series

Episodes
"Paradise Lost" (Agents of S.H.I.E.L.D.) (2016)
"Paradise Lost" (Bionic Woman) (2007)
"Paradise Lost" (Eureka Seven episode) (2005)
"Paradise Lost" (Justice League episode) (2002)
"Paradise Lost" (Sliders) (1997)
"Paradise Lost" (Star Trek: Deep Space Nine) (1996)
"Paradise Lost" (Stargate SG-1) (2003)
"Paradise Lost" (TaleSpin) (1991)
"Paradise Lost" (The Unit) (2007)

Books
Paradise Lost (novel), the third novel in the Japanese mystery series Joker Game
Paradise Lost: Smyrna 1922, a 2008 historical book by Giles Milton

Other uses
Paradise Lost (video game), a 2007 arcade version of Far Cry Instincts
Shitsurakuen, (translated literally as "Paradise Lost") a shōnen manga by Naomura Tooru
GTO: Paradise Lost, a 2014 manga by Tooru Fujisawa
Paradise Lost Orienteers, the orienteering club of the Gold Coast of Australia.

See also
Lost Paradise (disambiguation)
Paradises Lost